Maulana Khalil Ahmad is a Pakistani politician who was a member of the National Assembly of Pakistan from 2002 to 2007.

References

Living people
Pashtun people
Pakistani MNAs 2002–2007
People from Swabi District
Year of birth missing (living people)